The translationally controlled tumour protein, commonly known as TCTP, is a highly conserved protein among many eukaryotic organisms. TCTP is involved in a variety of cellular activities, including microtubule stabilization, calcium-binding activities, and apoptosis. The Mammalian translationally controlled tumour protein (TCTP) (or P23) is a protein which has been found to be preferentially synthesised in cells during the early growth phase of some types of tumour, but which is also expressed in normal cells. It was first identified as a histamine-releasing factor, acting in IgE +-dependent allergic reactions. In addition, TCTP has been shown to bind to tubulin in the cytoskeleton, has a high affinity for calcium, is the binding target for the antimalarial compound artemisinin, and is induced in vitamin D-dependent apoptosis. TCTP production is thought to be controlled at the translational as well as the transcriptional level.

Conservation
TCTP is a hydrophilic protein of 18 to 20 kD. TCTPs do not share significant sequence similarity with any other class of proteins. Recently, the structure of TCTP was determined and exhibited significant structural similarity to the human protein Mss4, which is a guanine nucleotide-free chaperone of the Rab protein. Translationally controlled tumor protein (TCTP) is a highly conserved protein found in eukaryotes, across animal and plant kingdoms and even in yeast. Close homologues have been found in plants, earthworm, Caenorhabditis elegans (F52H2.11), Hydra, Saccharomyces cerevisiae (YKL056c), Schizosaccharomyces pombe (SpAC1F12.02c) and protozoa like Trypanosoma brucei. Mammalian TCTP is ubiquitously expressed in various tissues and cell types.

Function 
Translationally-controlled tumor-associated protein (TCTP) has many roles in cellular processes, most notably in the following:
 cancer,
 embryo development, specifically axon growth and guidance,
 cell cycle,
 apoptosis,
 Cell proliferation,
 growth,
 tumor reversion,
 stress response,
 gene regulation,
 heat shock

In essence, TCTP functions as molecule that prevents cell death. It reduces cellular stress working as a heat shock protein and a molecular chaperone. It prevents cell death by binding to calcium, an ion that causes cell death. Furthermore, the N-terminal domain of TCTP inhibits apoptosis by binding to apoptotic factors and by  inhibiting p53 tumour suppressor-dependent apoptosis by downregulating it.

TCTP interacts with F-actin and mitotic spindle  and regulates cell shape by interacting with the cytoskeleton. Since most cellular processes, such as the cell cycle and cancer, involve changes in the cytoskeleton; it becomes apparent why TCTP is important. Moreover, if the gene encoding TCTP is knocked-out in mice, it becomes embryonic lethal, and they die in utero (in the womb).

Translationally Controlled Tumor Protein (TCTP/tpt1) is a regulator of the cancer stem cell compartment, the tumor reversion program, tumor progression and certain forms of inflammatory diseases.
Susini L et al. described TCTP as a pro-survival protein by antagonizing BAX function

Structure 
This structure has a very complex topology composed of four beta-sheets and three alpha helices.

Interactions 

TCTP has been shown to interact with:
 
 Bax, Bcl-2-associated X protein, 
 Mcl-1 
 Bcl-xL

TCTP is reported to interact with dozens of other proteins, which relates to its functions in many cellular and physiological processes.

References 

Protein domains